Lockets are a confectionery produced by the Wrigley Company in the UK and Czech Republic. They are sold as medicated supplement to help nasal congestion and sore throats.

Flavours
They are available in multiple flavours including cranberry and blueberry, menthol and honey. A blackcurrant flavour was produced, but was discontinued in 2009.

About
Lockets contain menthol, eucalyptus, vitamin C and a centre with honey. Packets generally contain 10 medicated lozenges.

Ingredients
Sugar
Glucose syrup
Honey
Glycerol
Citric Acid
Vitamin C
Monopropylene Glycol 
Colors E122 and E142

References

External links
 Lockets Site at Wrigley

Brand name snack foods
Throat lozenges
Wrigley Company brands